This is a list of known governors of the Roman province of Asia. Created after 133 BC, the province was eventually reorganized by the emperor Augustus who assigned it to the Senate as a proconsular governorship. The province was divided by Diocletian during his reorganization of the empire during the 290s, and a small portion of the province retained the name. Eventually the province was absorbed into the Thracesian Theme sometime during the seventh century. Many of the dates listed are approximate dates for the holding of the office.

Republican governors of Asia (133–27 BC)
Unless otherwise indicated, entries for the Republican period are based on T.R.S. Broughton, Magistrates of the Roman Republic (1952), vol. II.

 Quintus Mucius Scaevola Augur (97/96 BC)
 ? Lucius Gellius (93/92 BC). Alternatively proconsul in Cilicia.
 Gaius Julius Caesar (91/90 BC)
 L. Lucilius L.f. (? 90/89 BC)
 C. Cassius (89–87 BC). Appian calls him "Lucius Cassius".
 Lucius Licinius Murena (84/83 BC)
 ? L. Cornelius Lentulus (82/81 BC). Uncertain if proconsul in Asia or Africa.
 Marcus Minucius Thermus (80/79 BC)
 Gaius Claudius Nero (79/78 BC)
 ? Terentius Varro (77/76 BC)
 Marcus Junius Silanus (76/75 BC)
 M. Juncus (75/74 BC)
 Lucius Licinius Lucullus (73–69 BC)
 Publius Cornelius Dolabella (? 69/68 BC)
 Titus Aufidius (66/65 BC)
 Publius Varinius (65/64 BC)
 ? P. Orbius (64/63 BC)
 P. Servilius Globulus (63/62 BC)
 Lucius Valerius Flaccus (62/61 BC)
 Quintus Tullius Cicero (61–58 BC)
 Gaius Fabius Hadrianus (57/56 BC)
 Gaius Septimius (56/55 BC)
 Gaius Claudius Pulcher (55–53 BC)
 Quintus Minucius Thermus (52–49 BC)
 Lucius Antonius (49 BC): proquaestor pro praetore, left in command by Thermus
 Appuleius (47/46 BC): proquaestor pro praetore
 Publius Servilius Isauricus (46–44 BC): propraetor, then proconsul
 Gaius Trebonius (44/43 BC): murdered by Cornelius Dolabella January 43 BC
 ? M. Turius (42/41 BC): driven out of Asia by the Parthians
 Lucius Munatius Plancus (39/38 BC). Ronald Syme dates Plancus 39–37 BC. Broughton speculates he "probably took command in Asia as the Parthians retreated."
 Marcus Cocceius Nerva (38/37 BC)
 Gaius Furnius (35/34 BC). Syme dates Furnius 36–35 BC.
 ? Marcus Titius (34 BC)
 Asinius (Maurucinus ?) (34/33 BC)

Imperial proconsular governors of Asia (27 BC — AD 180)

Governors under Augustus 
Unless otherwise stated, the following entries are taken from K.M.T. Atkinson, "The Governors of the Province Asia in the Reign of Augustus", Historia: Zeitschrift für Alte Geschichte, 7 (1958), pp. 300–330

Governors under Tiberius 
Unless otherwise stated, the following entries are taken from Ronald Syme, "Problems about Proconsuls of Asia", Zeitschrift für Papyrologie und Epigraphik, 53 (1983), pp. 191–208

Governors under Caligula 
Unless otherwise stated, the following entries are taken from Syme, "Problems about Proconsuls", pp. 191–208

Governors under Claudius 
Unless otherwise stated, the following entries are taken from Syme, "Problems about Proconsuls", pp. 191–208

Governors under Nero and the Year of Four Emperors 
Unless otherwise stated, the following entries are taken from Syme, "Problems about Proconsuls", pp. 191–208

Governors under Vespasian and Titus 
Unless otherwise stated, the following entries are taken from Werner Eck, "Jahres- und Provinzialfasten der senatorischen Statthalter von 69/70 bis 138/139", Chiron, 12 (1982), pp. 284–303

Governors under Domitian 
Unless otherwise stated, the following entries are taken from Eck, "Jahres- und Provinzialfasten", pp. 304–323

Governors under Nerva and Trajan 
Unless otherwise stated, the following entries are taken from Eck, "Jahres- und Provinzialfasten", pp. 324–362

Governors under Hadrian 
Unless otherwise stated, the following entries are taken from Eck, "Jahres- und Provinzialfasten der senatorischen Statthalter von 69/70 bis 138/139", Chiron, 13 (1983),  pp. 147–185

Governors under Antoninus Pius 
Unless otherwise stated, the following entries are taken from Syme "The Proconsuls of Asia under Antoninus Pius", Zeitschrift für Papyrologie und Epigraphik, 51 (1983), 271-290

Governors under Marcus Aurelius 
Unless otherwise stated, the following entries are taken from Alföldy, Konsulat und Senatorenstand unter den Antoninen (Bonn: Habelt Verlag, 1977) pp. 214–217

Imperial proconsular governors of Asia (180 — 285)

Governors under Commodus
Unless otherwise stated, the following entries are taken from Paul M. M. Leunissen, Konsuln und Konsulare in der Zeit von Commodus bis Severus Alexander (Amsterdam: J.C. Gieben, 1989), pp. 221f

Governors under Septimus Severus 
Unless otherwise stated, the following entries are taken from Ségolène Demougin, "Proconsuls d'Asie sous Septime Sévère, les gouverneurs de la province de 200 à 211", Bulletin de la Société Nationale des Antiquaires de France, 1994 (1996), pp. 323-333

Governors under Caracalla 
Unless otherwise stated, the following entries are taken from Paul M. M. Leunissen, Konsuln und Konsulare in der Zeit von Commodus bis Severus Alexander (Amsterdam: J.C. Gieben, 1989), pp. 224f

Governors under Macrinus and Elagabalus 
Unless otherwise stated, the following entries are taken from Paul M. M. Leunissen, Konsuln und Konsulare in der Zeit von Commodus bis Severus Alexander (Amsterdam: J.C. Gieben, 1989), pp. 225f

Governors under Alexander Severus
Unless otherwise stated, the following entries are taken from Paul M. M. Leunissen, Konsuln und Konsulare in der Zeit von Commodus bis Severus Alexander (Amsterdam: J.C. Gieben, 1989), pp. 226-228

Third-century crisis (235–285)
 Lucius Valerius Messalla Apollinaris (between 236 and 238). 
 Flavius Balbus Diogenianus (between 236 and 238; less likely 250–1)
 Marcus Asinius Sabinianus (239 or 240)
 Lucius Egnatius Victor Lollianus (242–245)
 Flavius Maximillianus Montanus (248/249)
 Attius Rufinus (250s)
 Gaius Julius Flavius Proculus Quintilianus (249–250)
 Gaius Julius Octavius Volusenna Rogatianus (c. 253/256)
 Marcus Valerius Turbo (250s)
 Maximillianus (? 260)
 (?) Tiberius Pollienus Armenius Peregrinus (unknown date, possibly under Valerian)
 Arellius Fuscus (275)
 Faltonius Probus (276)
 Julius Proculus (276)
 Asclepiodotus (283) (praeses)

Imperial proconsular governors of Asia (285 — 395)

Governors under Diocletian
 Aurelius Hermogenianus (c. 286/305)
 Titus Flavius Festus (c. 286/293)
 Priscus (c. 286/305)
 Lucius Artorius Pius Maximus (c. 287/298)
 Junius Tiberianus (c. 293/303)
 Annius Epifanius (c. 293/305)

Governors under Constantine I
 Amnius Manius Caesonius Nicomachus Anicius Paulinus (c. 324/334)
 Quintus Fabius Titianus (c. 324/337)

Governors under Constantius II
 Lucius Caelius Montius (c. 340/350)
 Marinus (c. 351/354)
 Flavius Magnus (c. 354/359)
 Mantitheus (before 355)
 Julianus (360)

Governors under Julian and Jovian
 Aelius Claudius Dulcitius (361—363)
 Vitalius (363)

Governors under Valens
 Helpidius (364)
 Hormisdas (365)
 Clearchus (366—367)
 Eutropius (c. 371/372)
 Festus (372—378)

Governors under Theodosius I
 Septimius Maeadius (c. 379/386)
 Nummius Aemilianus Dexter (c. 379/387)
 Auxonius (381)
 Nicomachus Flavianus (382—383)
 Victorius (392—394)
 Aurelianus (395)

Imperial proconsular governors of Asia (395 — 491)

Governors under Arcadius
 Aeternalis (396)
 Simplicius (396)
 Nebridius (396)
 Julianus (397)
 Anatolius (c. 395/408)
 Flavius Anthemius Isidorus (c. 405/410)

Governors under Theodosius II
 Flavius Heliodorus (c. 439/442)
 Proculus (449)

Imperial proconsular governors of Asia (uncertain date)
 (?) Scaurianus (? late third century)
 Cassianus (third/fourth century)
 Cossinius Rufinus (? middle/late third century)
 Axiochus (? late fourth century)
 Ambrosius (? late fourth century)
 Messalinus (fourth/fifth century)
 Aristus (fourth/fifth century)
 Constantinus (fourth/fifth century)
 Nonnus (early fifth century)
 (?) Ignatius (early/mid fifth century)
 (?) Zosimianus (early/mid fifth century)
 Andreas (? fifth century)
 Flavius Axius Arcadius Phlegethius (late fifth/early sixth century)
 Damocharis (fourth/sixth century)
 Theodosius (fifth/sixth century)

Sources
 Géza Alföldy, Konsulat und Senatorenstand unter der Antoninen, Bonn: Rudolf Habelt Verlag (1977)
 Barnes, T.D., "Proconsuls of Asia under Caracalla", Phoenix, 40 (1986), pp. 202–205
 Broughton, T. Robert S., The Magistrates of the Roman Republic, Vol II (1952)
 Eck, Werner, "Jahres- und Provinzialfasten der senatorischen Statthalter von 69/70 bis 138/139", Chiron, 12 (1982), pp. 281–362; 13 (1983), pp. 147–237.
 Laale, Hans Willer, Ephesus (Ephesos): An Abbreviated History from Androclus to Constantine XI, WestBow  Press (2011)
 Martindale, J. R.; Jones, A. H. M, The Prosopography of the Later Roman Empire, Vol. I AD 260–395, Cambridge University Press (1971)
 Martindale, J. R.; Jones, A. H. M, The Prosopography of the Later Roman Empire, Vol. II AD 395–527, Cambridge University Press (1980)
 Mennen, Inge, Power and Status in the Roman Empire, AD 193-284 (2011)
 Syme, Ronald, "The Proconsuls of Asia under Antoninus Pius", Zeitschrift für Papyrologie und Epigraphik, 51 (1983), pp. 271–290
 Syme, Ronald, The Augustan Aristocracy (1986) Clarendon Press.

References

 
Roman governors of Asia
Asia